Hydra (sometimes spelled Ydra) was a Greek destroyer of the , which served with the Hellenic Navy during the early stages of the Second World War. It was named after the Saronic Gulf island of Hydra, which played an important role in the Greek War of Independence, and was the fourth ship to bear this name.

Design and construction
Displacement was  standard and  full load.

Armament consisted of four 120 mm (4.7 in) Ansaldo Model 1926 guns in single mounts, with anti aircraft protection provided by three 40 mm guns. Two triple 533 mm (21 inch) torpedo tubes were fitted, while Hydra was fitted for minelaying, and had rails for 40 mines. The ship had a crew of 156.
 
Hydra was launched at Odero's Sestri Ponente shipyard on October 21, 1931 and was commissioned by the Hellenic Navy in November 1932.

Service
On July 12, 1940, Hydra went to the aid of the lighthouse tender Orion which had been attacked by Italian aircraft, and was itself attacked by the Italian aircraft, but was unharmed. After the outbreak of the Greco-Italian War, she participated in the first naval raid against Italian shipping in the Strait of Otranto (November 14–15, 1940). During the German invasion of Greece, she was attacked by German bomber aircraft on April 22, 1941 and sunk near the island of Lagousa in the Saronic Gulf, together with her commander, Cmdr. Th. Pezopoulos and 41 members of her crew.

References

Citations

External links
Account of the sinking of Hydra by Vice Adm. G. Mezeviris, RHN

Kountouriotis-class destroyers
Ships built in Italy
1931 ships
World War II destroyers of Greece
World War II shipwrecks in the Aegean Sea
Maritime incidents in April 1941
Destroyers sunk by aircraft
Ships sunk by German aircraft
Shipwrecks of Greece